Lavris Peak is a snow-capped peak which rises to  in the northeastern portion of Mount Hartigan, in the Executive Committee Range, Marie Byrd Land, Antarctica. It was mapped by the United States Geological Survey from surveys and U.S. Navy trimetrogon photography, 1958–60, and was named by the Advisory Committee on Antarctic Names for William C. Lavris, a Meteorological Technician at Byrd Station in 1959.

References

Mountains of Marie Byrd Land
Executive Committee Range